Innozenz Stangl (11 March 1911 – 23 March 1991) was a German gymnast who won a team gold medal at the 1936 Summer Olympics. His best personal result was fourth place on the horizontal bar.

References

1911 births
1991 deaths
German male artistic gymnasts
Olympic gymnasts of Germany
Gymnasts at the 1936 Summer Olympics
Olympic gold medalists for Germany
Olympic medalists in gymnastics
Medalists at the 1936 Summer Olympics
Nazi Party members